Charles Noel Mariotti Tapia (born 10 March 1958) is a politician, manager, and broadcaster from the Dominican Republic. He was Senator for the province of Monte Plata, elected in 2006, and re-elected at 2010.

Mariotti was born in Las Matas de Farfán to Charles N. Mariotti Martini, an Italian-Dominican agronomist, and Enoé L. Tapia Suero.

Mariotti was Civil-Governor of Monte Plata from 1998 to 2000. Mariotti is also President of the Italy-Dominican Republic Parliamentary Association.

Media 
Radio

"Botando el Golpe", with Jochy Santos
"Solo para Mujeres"
"Gadejo y Algo Más"
"El Matutino de Rumba"

References 

Living people
1958 births
Dominican Republic people of Cocolo descent
Dominican Republic people of French descent
Dominican Republic people of Haitian descent
Dominican Republic people of Italian descent
People from San Juan Province (Dominican Republic)
Dominican Republic radio personalities
Dominican Liberation Party politicians
Pontificia Universidad Católica Madre y Maestra alumni
Members of the Senate of the Dominican Republic
White Dominicans